The North macroregion in Peru is a geographic area that includes a number of regions located in northern the country. It consists of the regions of Tumbes, Piura, Lambayeque, La Libertad, Cajamarca, San Martín, Amazonas and Ancash.

Regions

Main cities 

Main cities ordered by population.

More cities

See also
List of metropolitan areas of Peru
Regions of Peru

References

Macroregions
Geography of Peru